Pinotepa Mixtec is a Mixtec language of southern Oaxaca. Ethnologue lists the variety of San Juan Colorado / San Pedro Atoyac as a separate language.

Pinotepa Mixtec is spoken in a large number of towns: Pinotepa de Don Luis, San Antonio Tepetlapa, San Francisco Sayultepec, San Juan Atoyac, San Juan Jicayán, San Pedro Tulixtlahuaca, Santa Cruz Itacuán, Santa María Jicaltepec, San Antonio Tepetlapa, San Juan Cacahuatepec, San Miguel Tlacamama, San Pedro Jicayán, San Sebastian Ixcapa, Santiago Pinotepa Nacional, Tulixtlahuaca, San Juan Colorado, and San Pedro Atoyac.

References 

 Bradley, C. Henry. 1970. A linguistic sketch of Jicaltepec Mixtec. Norman, Oklahoma: Summer Institute of Linguistics of the University of Oklahoma.

Mixtec language